Barzana is a comune (municipality) in the Province of Bergamo in the Italian region of Lombardy, located about  northeast of Milan and about  northwest of Bergamo.

Barzana borders the following municipalities: Almenno San Bartolomeo, Brembate di Sopra, Mapello, Palazzago.

Demographic evolution

References